Tadeusz Kowalski (31 May 1894 – April 1940) was a Polish military officer and sportsman.

Biography
Kowalski was a competitive pair skater with partner Zofia Bilorówna. They were nine time (1927–1935) Polish national champions. They won the bronze medal at the 1934 European Figure Skating Championships. It was the first medal at that event for Poland. Their highest placement at the World Figure Skating Championships was 4th, which they accomplished in 1934.

Kowalski was also a footballer. Between 1912 and 1928, he played for the Czarni Lwow team. He was unsuccessfully trialled for entry into the Poland national football team which was projected to appear in the 1920 Summer Olympics but its attendance cancelled due to the outbreak of the Polish-Bolshevik War.

He was an officer of the Polish Army, lieutenant of artillery, who served in both the Polish-Bolshevik War and the Defensive War of 1939 at start of World War II when he was captured by the Soviet Union. He was killed at Kharkov during the Katyn massacre, aged 45. In 2007, the Polish Minister of Defense posthumously awarded him the rank of major.

Competitive highlights

References

European Championships medalists at the ISU official homepage
World Championships results

1894 births
1940 deaths
Sportspeople from Lviv
Polish male pair skaters
Polish footballers
Polish Army officers
Katyn massacre victims
European Figure Skating Championships medalists

Association footballers not categorized by position
Polish military personnel killed in World War II